Adult contemporary may refer to:

 Adult contemporary music, a music genre
Urban adult contemporary
Rhythmic adult contemporary
 Adult Contemporary (chart), a Billboard chart used in the United States
 Adult Contemporary (radio network)

See also
Adult entertainment (disambiguation)